Southern State College is the former name of at least two educational institutions in the United States:
Southern Arkansas University
University of South Dakota–Springfield